Chalfont Wasps Football Club is a football club based in Chalfont St Giles, near Amersham, England.

History
The club was established in 1922, and joined the Wycombe Combination. They were Division One champions in 1930–31 and again in 1939–40. After World War II the club won the Chalfont & District Minor League in 1946–47 and Division Two of the Wycombe Combination in 1948–49. At this time the club President was A.E. Kirby, the first female president of a football club. They won Division One again in 1960–61 and were Premier Division champions in 1963–64.

In 1984 Chalfont were founder members of the Chiltonian League. When it gained a second division the following season, the club were placed in Division One, but were relegated to Division Two at the end of the season, having finished second-from-bottom. The division was renamed Division One in 1987, and Chalfont were promoted to the Premier Division after finishing third in 1988–89. The club were relegated to Division One at the end of the 1991–92 season, but returned to the Premier Division after finishing as Division One runners-up in 1993–94. However, after finishing bottom of the Premier Division in 1995–96, the club were relegated back to Division One.

Despite finishing fifth in 1998–99, Chalfont were promoted to the Premier Division again. At the end of the following season the Chiltonian League merged into the Hellenic League, with the club becoming members of Division One East. They were runners-up in 2006–07, and were promoted to the Premier Division after winning Division One East in 2007–08. Despite finishing seventh in their first season in the Premier Division, they were demoted back to Division One East as their ground failed to meet the ground grading criteria. At the end of the 2017–18 season the club were demoted to Division Two East due to the ground not meeting the requirements for their level.

Ground
The club play at the Nest, located on council playing fields on Crossleys Road. The ground is unenclosed due to objections from the parish council.

Honours
Hellenic League
Division One East champions 2007–08
Wycombe Combination
Premier Division champions 1963–64
Division One champions 1930–31, 1939–40, 1960–61
Division Two champions 1948–49
Chalfont & District Minor League
Champions 1946–47
Berks & Bucks Intermediate Cup
Winners 2005–06, 2006–07, 2007–08, 2010–11
Wycombe Senior Cup
Winners 2007–08, 2009–10
Wycombe Junior Cup
Winners 2002–03, 2007–08, 2008–09, 2010–11, 2011–12, 2013–14
Chesham Challenge Cup
Winners 1930–31, 1939–40
Chalfont & Gerrards Cross Cup
Winners 1939–40, 1959–60, 1963–64, 1971–72
Chesham Charity Cup
Winners 1984–85, 1984–85, 1988–89, 1993–94
Chesham Subsidiary Cup
Winners 1971–72

Records
Highest league position: 7th in the Hellenic League Premier Division, 2007–08
Best FA Vase performance: Second qualifying round, 2008–09

References

External links
Official website

Football clubs in England
Football clubs in Buckinghamshire
Association football clubs established in 1922
1922 establishments in England
Chiltonian League
Hellenic Football League
Chalfont St Giles